Ivah Mae Wills Coburn (August 19, 1878 – April 27, 1937) was an American actress and Broadway producer.

Early life
Ivah Wills was from Appleton City, Missouri, the daughter of George Browning Wills and Anna Kunz Wills. She was raised in Brookston, Indiana. She studied drama at the Chicago Musical College.

Career

She began her acting career in touring companies run by E. H. Sothern and Amelia Bingham. Ivah Wills Coburn's Broadway performing and producing credits included The Yellow Jacket (1916), The Imaginary Invalid (1917), The Better 'Ole (1918-1919), Three Showers (1920), French Leave (1920), The Bronx Express (1922), The Farmer's Wife (1924-1925), The Right Age to Marry (1926), The Yellow Jacket (1928-1929), Falstaff (1928-1929), The Plutocrat (1930), and Troilus and Cressida (1932).

Coburn and her husband had a touring repertory company that presented Shakespeare, French and Greek dramas and comedies at college campuses throughout the United States. They directed the Mohawk Drama Festival in Schenectady, New York in 1935 and 1936.

Personal life
Ivah Wills met Charles Coburn when he was playing Orlando to her Rosalind in As You Like It. They married in 1906, in Baltimore. She died in 1937, at Lenox Hill Hospital, from "intestinal influenza". Among the honorary pallbearers at her funeral were George M. Cohan, Theodore E. Steinway,  Walter Hampden, Dixon Ryan Fox, Augustin Duncan, and Edgar Lee Masters. After her death, Charles Coburn left the stage and found success in films, winning the Academy Award for Best Supporting Actor in 1944 for The More the Merrier.

References

External links
 

1878 births
1937 deaths
People from Appleton City, Missouri
American stage actresses
20th-century American actresses
People from White County, Indiana
Actresses from Missouri
Actresses from Indiana
American theatre managers and producers
Women theatre managers and producers